Prospect is an unincorporated community and census-designated place (CDP) in Jackson County, in the U.S. state of Oregon. It lies along Oregon Route 62 on the Rogue River, in the Rogue River – Siskiyou National Forest. As of the 2010 census it had a population of 455.

History 

Prospect began as a logging town; its first sawmill began operating in 1870. Prospect had a post office established in 1882 that was first named "Deskins" after the first postmaster. In 1888, there was a mill named Deskins Sawmill. The name of the community was changed to "Prospect" in 1889 because of plans made to run a railroad up the Rogue River, which would ostensibly improve the community's prospects.

The Prospect Hotel, which opened in 1892, was listed in the National Register of Historic Places in 1980.

Local events and sites of interest
On the Saturday of Memorial Day weekend, Prospect holds the Mill Creek Memorial festival. It honors veterans with a parade, a flag retirement ceremony, live music and games for children. All the proceeds go to a fund to help veterans.

In July Prospect hosts an airplane "fly-in" that helps support the Jackson County Search and Rescue, and in August a jamboree and timber carnival (a festival that includes lumberjack contests such as log rolling) are held.

On the last weekend in September, Prospect hosts Music in the Mountains, a two-day festival of bluegrass, country, folk and Americana music on the grounds of the Prospect Hotel.

Prospect is the site of Prospect State Airport , which has one asphalt runway. It is used for general aviation operations, totaling about 1200 annual movements. The Prospect State Scenic Viewpoint is nearby.

Climate
This region experiences warm (but not hot) and dry summers, with no average monthly temperatures above .  According to the Köppen Climate Classification system, Prospect has a warm-summer Mediterranean climate, abbreviated "Csb" on climate maps.

References

External links 
History of the Prospect Hotel
Early resident of Prospect mentions "Deskins Sawmill"

Unincorporated communities in Jackson County, Oregon
Populated places established in 1870
Census-designated places in Oregon
Census-designated places in Jackson County, Oregon
1870 establishments in Oregon
Unincorporated communities in Oregon
Logging communities in the United States